Marble Skies is the third studio album by British art rock band Django Django. It reached number 25 on the UK Albums Chart in January 2018.

Reception

Marble Skies received positive reviews from critics. On Metacritic, the album holds a score of 73/100 based on 20 reviews, indicating "generally favorable reviews"

Track listing

Personnel 
 Dave Maclean – Drums, percussion, samples
 Vincent Neff – Vocals, backing vocals, guitars
 Jim Nixon – Backing vocals, bass guitar
 Tommy Grace – Synthesizers, keyboards

Charts

References

2018 albums
Django Django albums
Because Music albums